Leafs most commonly refers to the Toronto Maple Leafs, a National Hockey League team, based in Toronto, Ontario, Canada.

Leafs may also refer to:

In ice hockey:
Des Moines Oak Leafs, a minor league professional ice hockey team
Lethbridge Maple Leafs, a men's senior ice hockey team
Nelson Leafs, a Canadian 'B' Junior ice hockey team
St. John's Maple Leafs, an American Hockey League team, later relocated and renamed the Toronto Marlies
Verdun Maple Leafs (ice hockey), a defunct Quebec Major Junior Hockey League team
Victoria Maple Leafs, a Western Hockey League team

In baseball:
Danville Leafs, a professional minor league baseball team
Toronto Maple Leafs (semi-pro baseball), an Intercounty Baseball League team
Toronto Maple Leafs (International League), a former AAA minor league baseball team

In other sports:
Notre-Dame-de-Grace Maple Leafs, a defunct Canadian junior football team
Toronto Maple Leafs (soccer club), a Canadian National Soccer League club from the 1930s

See also
Leaf (disambiguation)
Leafing